This is a list of members of the Irish House of Commons between 1639 and 1649. There were almost 300 MPs at a time in this period.

References

 

639